Shake 'n Bake is a seasoned bread crumb coating originally marketed to mimic the flavor and texture of Southern fried chicken. Introduced in 1965 by General Foods, it is currently made under the Kraft Heinz brand.

Concept 
Shake 'n Bake provides a baked alternative to foods fried in oil. The product is applied by placing raw meat or vegetable pieces in a bag containing the coating, closing the bag, and shaking it so the coating adheres to the pieces. They are then placed on a baking sheet and cooked in an oven. Shake 'n Bake has been marketed as a healthier and less-greasy alternative to frying, with slogans such as, "Shake 'n Bake: It's better than frying", and "Why fry? Shake 'n Bake".

Ingredients

Shake 'n Bake Original Pork flavor contains the following ingredients: enriched wheat flour (wheat flour, niacin, iron, thiamin mononitrate Vitamin B1, riboflavin (vitamin B2), folic acid), salt, partially hydrogenated soybean and cottonseed oil, sugar, contains less than 2% of paprika, dextrose, dried onions, spice, caramel color, yeast, annatto (color), and natural flavor. Barbecue flavor Shake 'n Bake includes sugar, maltodextrin, salt, modified food starch, spice, partially hydrogenated soybean and cottonseed oil, brown sugar, mustard seed flour, dried onions, dried tomatoes, dried garlic, beet powder (color), citric acid, natural flavor, caramel color, vinegar, and sodium silicoaluminate as an anticaking agent.

Advertisements

Shake 'n Bake is particularly noted for its television commercials in the 1960s, 1970s, 1980s, and 1990s, starring such child actors as Carrie Jean Cochran, Carly Schroeder, Taylor Momsen, and Philip Amelio. In the ads, the aforementioned children help make Shake 'n Bake with their mothers, enthusiastically exclaiming, "And I helped!"

Advertisements for Shake 'n Bake in 1981 included Ann B. Davis, who played Alice the housekeeper on The Brady Bunch. The ad copy includes the catchphrases, "Gotta be crispy, gotta be golden, gotta be juicy", and, "You just shake then bake, and that chicken's so crisp and juicy and golden it makes me look golden, if you know what I mean".

In 1990, two commercials were produced which show what pork chops and chicken look like after frying. They then show that pork chops and chicken are crispier, juicier, more plump, and more tender when used with Shake n' Bake than when fried. They conclude with, "Why fry? Shake n' Bake".

In 1998, a new commercial was tried with a different catchphrase: "Mama made Shake 'n Bake, and I helped".

References

External links
 

Kraft Foods brands
Baked foods